Oleg Shamaev (born August 2, 1982 in Chirchik) is an alpine skier from Uzbekistan. He competed for Uzbekistan at the 2010 Winter Olympics in the slalom and giant slalom. Shamaev was Uzbekistan's flag bearer during the 2010 Winter Olympics opening ceremony.

References 

1982 births
Living people
Uzbekistani male alpine skiers
Olympic alpine skiers of Uzbekistan
Alpine skiers at the 2010 Winter Olympics
Alpine skiers at the 2007 Asian Winter Games